Gorybia quadrispinosa is a species of beetle in the family Cerambycidae. It was described by Galileo and Martins in 2008.

References

Piezocerini
Beetles described in 2008